The United Nations Educational, Scientific and Cultural Organization (UNESCO) World Heritage Sites are places of importance to cultural or natural heritage as described in the UNESCO World Heritage Convention, established in 1972. Cultural heritage consists of monuments (such as architectural works, monumental sculptures, or inscriptions), groups of buildings, and sites (including archaeological sites). Natural features (consisting of physical and biological formations), geological and physiographical formations (including habitats of threatened species of animals and plants), and natural sites which are important from the point of view of science, conservation or natural beauty, are defined as natural heritage.  Bangladesh accepted the convention on 3 August 1983, making its historical sites eligible for inclusion on the list.

, there are three World Heritage Sites in Bangladesh, and a further five on the tentative list. The first two sites listed were the Mosque City of Bagerhat and the Ruins of the Buddhist Vihara at Paharpur, in 1985. Both sites are cultural. The most recent site, the Sundarbans, was listed in 1997 and is a natural site.

World Heritage Sites
UNESCO lists sites under ten criteria; each entry must meet at least one of the criteria. Criteria i through vi are cultural, and vii through x are natural.

Tentative list
In addition to sites inscribed on the World Heritage List, member states can maintain a list of tentative sites that they may consider for nomination. Nominations for the World Heritage List are only accepted if the site was previously listed on the tentative list. , Bangladesh lists five properties on its tentative list.

See also
Tourism in Bangladesh
 List of archaeological sites in Bangladesh

References

 
Bangladesh
Bangladesh 
World Heritage Sites